William Penn Murfee (born May 2, 1994) is an American professional baseball pitcher for the Seattle Mariners of Major League Baseball (MLB). He made his MLB debut in 2022.

Career

Amateur career
Murfee attended Montgomery Bell Academy in Nashville, Tennessee. Undrafted out of high school in 2013, Murfree attended Vanderbilt University. Murfee redshirted his freshman season, and played college baseball for the Commodores for three seasons. Murfee was an infielder his first two seasons, before converting to pitching for his final year at Vanderbilt. Murfee transferred to Santa Clara University for his redshirt senior season.

Seattle Mariners
Murfee was drafted by the Seattle Mariners in the 33rd round, with the 988th overall selection, of the 2018 Major League baseball (MLB) draft.

He spent the 2018 season with the Everett AquaSox, going 3–2 with a 6.55 ERA over 33 innings. In 2019, he split between the Modesto Nuts, Arkansas Travelers, and Tacoma Rainiers, going a combined 6–5 with a 3.57 ERA and 136 strikeouts over  innings. Murfee received the Mariners 2019 minor league "60 ft., 6-in Club” Award.

After the season, he played for the Peoria Javelinas of the Arizona Fall League. And also, on October 10, 2019, he was selected for the United States national baseball team at the 2019 WBSC Premier 12. Murfee did not play in a game in 2020 due to the cancellation of the minor league season because of the COVID-19 pandemic. In 2021, he split the season between Double-A Arkansas and Triple-A Tacoma, posting a 7-3 record and 4.23 ERA with 97 strikeouts in 78.2 innings pitched across 26 appearances (14 starts). He was assigned to Tacoma to begin the 2022 season.

On April 20, 2022, Murfee was added to the Mariners active roster. Murfee was unused out of the Mariners bullpen in the six days he spent on the active roster, and was removed from the 40-man roster and returned to Triple-A on April 27. Due to his time spent on Seattle’s active roster, but no major league playing time, Murfee became a phantom ballplayer. The following day, Murfee was re-selected to the 40-man and active rosters. He made his MLB debut on April 29, 2022, pitching against the Miami Marlins and recording his first two strikeouts. He made 64 appearances for Seattle in his rookie campaign, pitching to a 4-0 record and 2.99 ERA with 76 strikeouts in 69.1 innings of work.

References

External links

Vanderbilt Commodores bio
Santa Clara Broncos bio

1994 births
Living people
Arkansas Travelers players
Baseball players from Nashville, Tennessee
Everett AquaSox players
Leones del Escogido players
Major League Baseball pitchers
Modesto Nuts players
Peoria Javelinas players
Santa Clara Broncos baseball players
Seattle Mariners players
Tacoma Rainiers players
United States national baseball team players
Vanderbilt Commodores baseball players
2019 WBSC Premier12 players